Inezia is a genus of South African plants in the sunflower family.

Etymology
The genus name honours Inez Clare Verdoorn (1896–1989), a South African taxonomist.

Description
The species Inezia integrifolia was first described by Klatt as Lidbeckia integrifolia and occurs in Mpumalanga and Eswatini. It is described by Phillips as "a perennial herb with unbranched stems from a woody rootstock; leaves alternate, linear to lanceolate, punctate, pilose; heads solitary, terminal, peduncled."

 Species
 Inezia integrifolia (Klatt) E.Phillips - Mpumalanga, Eswatini
 Inezia speciosa Brusse - Limpopo

References

Flora of Southern Africa
Anthemideae
Asteraceae genera
Taxa named by Edwin Percy Phillips